Malchenko is a surname. Notable people with the surname include:

Eduard Malchenko (born 1986), Russian high jumper
Sergey Malchenko (born 1968), Russian high jumper

See also
 

Ukrainian-language surnames